Stichophthalma is a genus of butterflies in the family Nymphalidae called jungle queens. The members are confined to India, China and Southeast Asia.

Species
 Stichophthalma camadeva (Westwood, 1848) – northern jungle queen
 Stichophthalma cambodia (Hewitson, 1862)
 Stichophthalma fruhstorferi Röber, 1903 (northern Vietnam)
 Stichophthalma godfreyi Rothschild, 1916
 Stichophthalma howqua (Westwood, 1851)
 Stichophthalma louisa Wood-Mason, 1877
 Stichophthalma neumogeni Leech, [1892] (western China, Tibet, southern Vietnam, Hainan Island)
 Stichophthalma nourmahal (Westwood, 1851) – chocolate jungle queen
 Stichophthalma sparta de Nicéville, 1894 – Manipur jungle queen
 Stichophthalma uemurai Nishimura, 1998 (Vietnam)

References

External links
Images representing Stichophthalma at EOL

Amathusiini
Nymphalidae genera
Taxa named by Baron Cajetan von Felder
Taxa named by Rudolf Felder
Morphinae